The 2006-07 BDO Classic Canadian Open of Curling was held January 24–28, 2007 at the MTS Centre in Winnipeg, Manitoba.

Standings

Group A

Group B

Group C

Play-offs

References

External links
2017 BDO Classic Canadian Open of Curling: CurlingZone

2006-07
2007 in Canadian curling
Curling competitions in Winnipeg
January 2007 sports events in Canada
2007 in Manitoba